Chitete  is the administrative ward in Ileje District, Songwe Region, Tanzania. According to the 2012 census, the ward has a total population of 8,673. Postal code of 53405.

References	
 	

Wards of Songwe Region